Corentin Koçur (born 10 October 1995) is a Belgian footballer.

External links

1995 births
Living people
Belgian footballers
RC Lens players
R.E. Mouscron players
Royal Excel Mouscron players
CS Fola Esch players
Royal Knokke F.C. players
Belgian Pro League players
Belgian Third Division players
Luxembourg National Division players
Sportspeople from Tourcoing
Association football defenders
Footballers from Hauts-de-France
Belgian expatriate sportspeople in Luxembourg
Belgian expatriate footballers
Expatriate footballers in Luxembourg